Two-time defending champion Monica Seles successfully defended her title, defeating Martina Navratilova in a rematch of the previous year's final, 7–5, 6–3, 6–1 to win the singles tennis title at the 1992 Virginia Slims Championships.

Seeds

Draw

Finals
 NB: The final was the best of 5 sets while all other rounds were the best of 3 sets.

See also
WTA Tour Championships appearances

References

Singles 1992
1992 WTA Tour